American singer LeAnn Rimes has won over eleven awards and has received roughly 22 nominations. She won her first set of awards in 1996 at the Academy of Country Music Awards for her debut single "Blue". In 2008, she won the Humanitarian Award from the ACM organization. In 1997, she won several more accolades for similar from the Country Music Association and the American Music Awards. She also received nominations from several award programs for her recording of "How Do I Live". The same year, Rimes won two accolades from the Grammy Awards including the award for Best New Artist. She has also received five nominations from the Grammys. She has since won awards from the CMT Music Awards and the GMA Dove Awards.

Academy of Country Music Awards

!
|-
| rowspan="4"| 1996
| Blue
| Album of the Year
| 
| rowspan="10"| 
|-
| rowspan="2"|  "Blue"
| Single Record of the Year
| 
|-
| Song of the Year
| 
|-
| LeAnn Rimes
| Top New Female Vocalist
| 
|-
| rowspan="3"| 1997
| rowspan="2"| "How Do I Live"
| Single Record of the Year 
| 
|-
| Song of the Year
| 
|-
| rowspan="2"| LeAnn Rimes
| rowspan="2"| Top Female Vocalist
| 
|-
| rowspan="2"| 2007
| 
|-
| "Till We Ain't Strangers Anymore" 
| Vocal Event of the Year
| 
|-
| 2008
| LeAnn Rimes
| The Home Depot Humanitarian Award
| 
|-
|}

American Music Awards

!
|-
| 1997
| rowspan="2"| LeAnn Rimes
| Favorite New Country Artist
| 
| 
|-
| rowspan="2"| 1998
| Favorite Country Female Artist
| 
| 
|-
| Unchained Melody: The Early Years
| Favorite Country Album
| 
| 
|-
| 1999
| rowspan="3"| LeAnn Rimes
| Favorite Country Female Artist
| 
|
|-
| 2002
| Favorite Adult Contemporary Artist
| 
|
|-
| 2005
| Favorite Country Female Artist
| 
|
|-
|}

Billboard Music Awards

!
|-
| rowspan="4"| 1997
| rowspan="3"| LeAnn Rimes
| Artist of the Year
| 
| rowspan="4"| 
|-
| Country Artist of the Year
| 
|-
| Country Singles Artist of the Year
| 
|-
| Blue
| Country Album of the Year
| 
|-
|}

CMT Music Awards

!
|-
| 1997
| LeAnn Rimes
| Female Star of Tomorrow
| 
| 
|-
| 2002
| "Life Goes On"
| Hottest Female Video
| 
| 
|-
| 2008
| "Till We Ain't Strangers Anymore" 
| Collaborative Video of the Year
| 
| 
|-
|}

Country Music Association Awards

!
|-
| rowspan="2"| 1996
| LeAnn Rimes
| Horizon Award
| 
| rowspan="5"| 
|-
| "Blue"
| Single Record of the Year
| 
|-
| rowspan="3"| 1997
| rowspan="2"| LeAnn Rimes
| Horizon Award
| 
|-
| Female Vocalist of the Year
| 
|-
| Blue
| Album of the Year 
| 
|-
|}

GMA Dove Awards

!
|-
| 2008
| "Ready for a Miracle"
| Traditional Gospel Recorded Song of the Year
| 
| 
|-
|}

Grammy Awards

!
|-
| rowspan="2"| 1997
| LeAnn Rimes
| Best New Artist
| 
|
|-
| "Blue"
| rowspan="6"| Best Female Country Vocal Performance
| 
|
|-
| 1998
| "How Do I Live"
| 
|
|-
| 2007
| "Something's Gotta Give"
| 
|
|-
| 2008
| "Nothin' Better To Do"
| 
|
|-
| 2009
| "What I Cannot Change"
| 
|
|-
| 2011
| "Swingin'"
| 
|
|-
|}

World Music Awards

!Ref.
|-
| rowspan=2|1998
| rowspan=2|Herself
| World's Best Selling American Artist
| 
| rowspan=2|
|-
| World's Best Selling Country Artist
|

References

Rimes, LeAnn